Events from the year 1418 in France.

Incumbents
 Monarch – Charles VI

Events
 19 May – John the Fearless, Duke of Burgundy captures Paris during the Hundred Years War.
 29 July – The English under Henry V commence the siege of Rouen in Normandy
 Unknown – The Garde Écossaise are formed

Births
 Unknown – Peter II, Duke of Brittany, ruler of the Duchy of Brittany (died 1457)
 Unknown – Philippe de Crèvecœur d'Esquerdes, Marshal of France (died 1494)

Deaths
 22 March – Nicolas Flamel, writer (born 1340)
 29 May – Henry of Marle, courtier 
 12 June – Bernard VII, Count of Armagnac, Constable of France (born 1360)

References

1410s in France